The discography of Skunk Anansie, an English rock band, consists of six studio albums and twenty-four singles, including one re-issue. The band's members include Skin (Deborah Dyer), Cass (Richard Lewis), Ace (Martin Kent) and Mark Richardson. The group formed in 1994 and disbanded in 2001; they re-united in 2009. Skunk Anansie are named after the West African folk tales of Anansi the Spider-man, with "Skunk" added to "make the name nastier".

In 1995, Skunk Anansie released their debut album Paranoid and Sunburnt on the One Little Indian record label. It was recorded with Robbie France on drums, who left before the album was released. Mark Richardson replaced France. The album peaked at number eight on the UK albums chart and was certified Platinum in their native United Kingdom with a Gold certification in the Netherlands; the band also won the Kerrang! Award for "Best British Band" in the same year. Paranoid and Sunburnt spawned two top 20 singles in the United Kingdom: "Weak" and a re-issue of "Charity", which had previously made the top 40.

One year after the release of their debut, Skunk Anansie released Stoosh, which was certified gold in several European countries, with a Platinum certification in Italy and also became their second UK album to be certified Platinum, while peaking at number nine on the UK album charts. Stoosh spawned their highest-charting singles, which included "Hedonism (Just Because You Feel Good)", which reached the top 20 in several European countries. "Brazen (Weep)" from the same album became their highest-charting UK single, peaking at number 11. European sales for the album stand at two million. Skunk Anansie released Post Orgasmic Chill on Virgin in 1999. The album was certified Platinum by the International Federation of the Phonographic Industry (IFPI) for selling more than 1 million units in Europe and the UK. The album was multi-platinum in both Italy and Portugal.

2009 saw the band re-unite, with the single releases of "Because of You" and "Squander", from the compilation Smashes and Trashes. The album was certified Gold in Poland and Italy while also making the top 10 in Portugal. 
Skunk Anansie's first studio album after the reunion, Wonderlustre, was released internationally on 13 September 2010. 
Despite debuting at number 1 in Italy, the album charted moderately in many European territories and became their first studio album to miss the UK top 40. Wonderlustre spawned the singles "My Ugly Boy", "Over the Love" and "You Saved Me". 
In 2012, the band released the album Black Traffic, which reached the top 10 in Italy and Switzerland. Their sixth studio album, Anarchytecture, was released on 15 January 2016.

In July 2019, Skunk Anansie released the single "What You Do For Love". A video for the song was also released.

Albums

Studio albums

Live albums

Compilation albums

Singles

Notes

ILimited-edition vinyl promotional release.

Other appearances

Music videos

References

External links
 Official Band Website
 https://www.facebook.com/skunkanansieitalia/?fref=ts

Rock music group discographies
Discographies of British artists